Timothy Phillip Burke (born February 19, 1959) is a retired  Major League Baseball relief pitcher who played for the Montreal Expos, New York Mets, and New York Yankees. He batted and threw right-handed.  Between 1987 and 1988, he briefly had the lowest career earned run average for a relief pitcher, and his career earned run average of 2.72 is lower than all Hall of Famer relief pitchers except for Mariano Rivera and Hoyt Wilhelm.

Career
Drafted by the Pittsburgh Pirates in round two of the 1980 MLB draft, Burke was traded to the Yankees on December 22, 1982, and then after a year in New York's minor league system, was dealt to the Expos for outfielder Pat Rooney on December 20, 1983.  Although he was primarily a starting pitcher over his four minor league seasons, he made his major league debut with the Expos on April 8, 1985, in relief.  In an eight-season career, he posted a 49–33 record with a 2.72 ERA and 102 saves in 498 games pitched, all but two out of the bullpen. He led the National League in appearances in 1985, with 78. He was selected to the National League All-star team in 1989.

Personal
Along with his wife, Christine, Burke adopted two orphan children from Korea, one from Vietnam, and one from Guatemala with the assistance of International Children Services in Eugene, Oregon. A born-again Christian, he retired from baseball in 1993 in order to help raise his four adopted children. In 1994 he authored the book Major League Dad: The Moving Story of an All-Star Pitcher Who Gave up Baseball for His Family.

In 1995, Burke appeared in the Geoff Moore & the Distance music video for the song "Home Run".

Burke currently resides in Littleton, Colorado.

References

External links

1959 births
Living people
Alexandria Dukes players
American expatriate baseball players in Canada
Baseball players from Nebraska
Buffalo Bisons (minor league) players
Columbus Clippers players
Indianapolis Indians players
Major League Baseball pitchers
Montreal Expos players
Nashville Sounds players
National League All-Stars
Nebraska Cornhuskers baseball players
New York Mets players
New York Yankees players
Sportspeople from Omaha, Nebraska